Avdelan-e Sofla (also Romanized as Āvdelān-e Soflá; also known as Ābdīlān) is a village in Beradust Rural District, Sumay-ye Beradust District, Urmia County, West Azerbaijan Province, Iran. At the 2006 census, its population was 276, in 45 families.

References 

Populated places in Urmia County